Calledapteryx is a monotypic scoopwing moth genus in the family Uraniidae. Its only species, Calledapteryx dryopterata, the brown scoopwing moth, is found in eastern North America. Both the genus and species were first described by Augustus Radcliffe Grote in 1868.

References

Further reading

External links

 

Uraniidae
Articles created by Qbugbot
Monotypic moth genera